Paradoxophyla tiarano is a species of frog in the family Microhylidae endemic to Madagascar.

References

Paradoxophyla
Endemic frogs of Madagascar
Amphibians described in 2006